Emmanuel Adariku (born 13 April 1998) is a Nigerian professional footballer who formerly played as a defender for Hapoel Hadera.

References

External links 

1998 births
Living people
Nigerian footballers
Association football defenders
Hapoel Hadera F.C. players
Israeli Premier League players
Nigerian expatriate footballers
Expatriate footballers in Israel
Nigerian expatriate sportspeople in Israel